Panao District is one of four districts of the province Pachitea in Peru.

Geography 
Some of the highest mountains of the district are listed below:

Ethnic groups 
The people in the district are mainly indigenous citizens of Quechua descent. Quechua is the language which the majority of the population (57.01%) learnt to speak in childhood, 42.69% of the residents started speaking using the Spanish language (2007 Peru Census).

References